The Game Plan is a 2007 American sports family comedy film directed by Andy Fickman and with a screenplay by Nichole Millard and Kathryn Price from a story by Millard, Price and Audrey Wells. The film stars Dwayne "The Rock" Johnson in the lead role, Madison Pettis and Kyra Sedgwick. It follows a professional quarterback who finds out he has an eight-year-old daughter from a previous relationship.

It was the last film to be distributed by Buena Vista Pictures Distribution, after Disney retired the Buena Vista moniker across their company's divisions in the same year. It is also the final film where Johnson is credited with his ring name. The Game Plan was released in the United States on September 28, 2007, and grossed $146 million worldwide.

Plot 
In the last game of the American Football Federation regular season between the Boston Rebels and the New York Dukes, Rebels quarterback Joe Kingman scores a touchdown after ignoring an open wide receiver, Travis Sanders. The next morning, an eight-year-old girl named Peyton Kelly arrives on Joe's doorstep saying that she is his biological daughter, and that his ex-wife, Sara, sent her there to meet him. His agent, Stella Peck thinks this will be bad for his image and distracts him with the upcoming playoffs.

At the opening of his own restaurant/nightclub and bar, Joe inadvertently leaves without Peyton and is on the cover of a tabloid the next day. Stella decides Joe needs a new fatherly image. At a later press conference, the reporters make Joe miserable, until Peyton comes to his defense, saying that he is new to this and trying the best he can and that she thinks he is the best father in the world. Peyton then says that Joe has to repay her, so she has him take her to a ballet academy run by Monique Vasquez. Monique has Joe join their ballet performance to show him that ballet takes just as much athletic ability as football. Joe and Peyton begin their relationship after Peyton calls his arrogant and selfish behavior to his attention. Joe takes Peyton and her new friends to the mall where he begins to develop romantic feelings for Monique.

The Rebels march through the playoffs via three road games: Denver in the Wild Card round, Indianapolis in the Divisional round, and finally Baltimore in the Conference round. They eventually make it to the championship game held in Arizona in a rematch with the New York Dukes. Stella offers Joe a $25 million endorsement deal with Fanny's Burgers, a successful fast food restaurant run by Samuel Blake, Jr., if he wins the game and mentions the product to the press. While at lunch with Joe and Monique at the Barking Crab, Peyton accidentally reveals that she was scheduled to go to a ballet school program for the month, but instead, she ran away to meet her father. Before Joe can fully process this, Peyton has an allergic reaction to the nuts in the dessert she was eating, and Joe rushes her to the hospital; however, the doctors tell him that the reaction is mild, and his daughter is going to be fine.

Joe's former sister-in-law and Peyton's legal guardian, Karen Kelly, arrives to take her home and reveals to Joe that Sara was killed in a traffic accident six months earlier. After Peyton overhears Stella on the phone explaining that she would be a huge distraction to Joe, Peyton decides to return home with Karen. Later, while going through Peyton's bag under her bed at Joe's house, Joe finds some photos and reads a letter from Sara, saying that she hid Peyton away from Joe, as his career was just starting and she didn’t want Peyton to be a distraction to him.

As the championship game begins, Joe's mind is not fully set on the game and he is soon injured. Joe is then surprised to discover that Peyton has arrived with Karen. Understanding Joe's earlier words about how he wants to remain in Peyton's life, Karen decides to let Peyton live with Joe. Near the end of the fourth quarter, Joe passes the ball to the running back, Jamal Webber, who gains positive yardage but fails to get out of bounds. Joe hurries his team to the line with the clock running and rushes ahead before being knocked out of bounds. With time for one last play, Joe throws a lob pass to Sanders, who catches the pass, allowing the Rebels to win their first championship. In a post-game interview, Joe declines the Fanny's Burgers offer to be with Peyton.

Cast 
 Dwayne "The Rock" Johnson as Joseph "Joe" Kingman
 Madison Pettis as Peyton Kelly
 Roselyn Sánchez as Monique Vasquez
 Kyra Sedgwick as Stella Peck
 Morris Chestnut as Travis Sanders
 Paige Turco as Karen Kelly
 Hayes MacArthur as Kyle Cooper
 Brian J. White as Jamal Webber
 Jamal Duff as Clarence Monroe
 Lauren Storm as Nanny Cindy
 Gordon Clapp as Coach Mark Maddox
 Kate Nauta as Tatianna
 Robert Torti as Samuel "Sam" Blake Jr.
 Elizabeth Chambers as Kathryn

Marv Albert and Boomer Esiason portray themselves, offering commentary in every game. Steve Levy also portrays himself as part of one game's postgame coverage for SportsCenter. Stuart Scott makes a cameo as himself on SportsCenter giving a report on Joe Kingman.

Production 
The Game Plan was filmed in the Boston, Massachusetts area. The movie was also filmed in three stadiums across the country: Gillette Stadium in Foxboro, Invesco Field at Mile High in Denver, and Sun Devil Stadium in Arizona.

Johnson's character taking ballet lessons in the movie was an indirect nod to Pro Football Hall of Fame wide receiver Lynn Swann, who took ballet lessons during his NFL career with the Pittsburgh Steelers. Swann later worked as a reporter for Disney-owned ABC and ESPN. Swann left Disney for a career in politics while The Game Plan was in pre-production.

Reception

Critical response 
Review aggregation website Rotten Tomatoes reports a 28% rating based on 102 reviews, and an average rating of 4.61/10. The website's critical consensus reads, "Despite The Rock's abundant charisma, The Game Plan is just another run-of-the-mill Disney comedy." On Metacritic, the film has a score of 44 out of 100, based on 23 critics, indicating "mixed or average reviews". Audiences polled by CinemaScore gave the film an average grade of "A" on an A+ to F scale.

Box office 
Produced at an estimated cost of US$22 million, the film grossed $90,648,202 in the U.S market and $55,942,785 in foreign ticket sales and $50,643,312 brought from DVD sales, in its stay on the Top 50 chart,  sales producing a grand total gross of $197,234,299, clearly makes this film a profitable venture for Disney. It opened at #1 at the box office grossing $22,950,971 in its first weekend in 3,103 theaters and averaging $7,396 per venue. It closed on February 18, 2008, with a final domestic gross of $90,648,202.

Home media 
The Game Plan was released on DVD and Blu-ray on January 22, 2008. Through April 27, 2008, DVD rentals for The Game Plan were able to stay in the Top 50 chart, while earning more than $48 million.

See also 
 Mr. Nanny

References

External links 

 
 
 
 
 
 

2007 films
2007 comedy films
2000s children's comedy films
2000s English-language films
2000s sports comedy films
American children's comedy films
American football films
American sports comedy films
Films about father–daughter relationships
Films directed by Andy Fickman
Films scored by Nathan Wang
Films set in Boston
Films shot in Boston
Films with screenplays by Audrey Wells
Walt Disney Pictures films
2000s American films